Varun Thakkar (born 10 February 1995 in Tamil Nadu) is an Indian professional sailor. He is currently representing India at the international sailing events in the 49er class of the boat category.

Career
In 2021, Thakkar secured the first rank at the 49er Class event in the Mussanah Open Championship 2021 at Millennium Resort, Oman. He also won a bronze medal in the 2018 Asian Games which were held in Jakarta, Indonesia.

In 2018 Asian Games in Jakarta, The duo KC Ganapathy and Varun Thakkar first tasted major success when they won bronze in sailing.

2020 Summer Olympics
Varun qualified for his debut Olympic Games 2020 in sailing after achieving first place in the 2021 Mussanah Open (Asia and Africa Olympic Qualifier) Tournament in Mussanah, Oman and he will now be representing Team India at the Skiff – 49er Event in Sailing at the 2020 Summer Olympics in Tokyo, Japan.

Tournaments Record

References

External links
 
 
 

1995 births
Living people
Place of birth missing (living people)
Indian male sailors (sport)
Sportspeople from Tamil Nadu
Asian Games bronze medalists for India
Asian Games medalists in sailing
Sailors at the 2018 Asian Games
Medalists at the 2018 Asian Games
Olympic sailors of India
Sailors at the 2020 Summer Olympics – 49er